Chamaedorea seifrizii is a species of palm referred to as bamboo palm, parlor palm, or reed palm. It is a subtropical palm that grows up to 20 feet tall, and is commonly used as a houseplant. The evergreen leaves are pinnately divided, and yellow flowers are borne on a panicle. The fruit are small, round, and black.

Native to Mexico and Central America, it grows in disturbed forest habitats and in mesic soils over limestone. The species has been introduced to Florida where it is grown as a hedge plant. It has been found to escape cultivation.

The species is named for botanist William Seifriz.

References

seifrizii
Taxa named by Max Burret